Benton Park is a census-designated place (CDP) in Kern County, California. Although it is designated by the census as its own place, it is functionally a neighborhood of Bakersfield.

The boundaries of the neighborhood of Benton Park extend further than the boundaries of the CDP.

Geography 
Benton Park is surrounded on 3 sides by the city of Bakersfield, but borders Old Stine, California to the west.

Demographics 
The CDP was first listed in the 2020 census, at which it had 5,333 people in 1,545 households.

References 

Census-designated places in Kern County, California
Census-designated places in California